August Schaffer (born 3 July 1905, date of death unknown) was an Austrian cyclist. He competed in the sprint and tandem events at the 1928 Summer Olympics.

References

External links
 

1905 births
Year of death missing
Austrian male cyclists
Olympic cyclists of Austria
Cyclists at the 1928 Summer Olympics
Cyclists from Vienna